Parachute Battalion is a 1941 war film directed by Leslie Goodwins and stars Robert Preston and Nancy Kelly. The supporting cast includes Edmond O'Brien, Harry Carey, and Buddy Ebsen.

Plot
Three men enlist in the United States Army in the summer of 1941. Bill Burke (Edmond O'Brien) is doubtful of his own courage and enlists while intoxicated. Don Morse (Robert Preston), an All-American football player at Harvard, enlists to avoid being engaged to two women simultaneously, told that army privates are not allowed to marry. Jeff Hollis (Buddy Ebsen) is a hillbilly cajoled into enlisting by the daughter of a feuding family.

They meet on the train to Fort Benning, Georgia, for training as parachute infantry. Don and Bill's attempts to become better acquainted with pretty fellow passenger Kit Richards (Nancy Kelly) annoy her father, Bill "Old Thunderhead" Richards (Harry Carey), until they reveal that they are Army recruits.

In camp, they are surprised to discover that Richards is a master sergeant newly assigned to their unit as chief instructor and a pioneer of the concept. Richards reports to the commandant, his old friend and Bill's father. Bill was named after Richards and they agree to keep Bill's identity a secret from the rest of the company to avoid favoritism.  Bill accepts a blind date and finds out it is Kit. When Don tries to date her, Richards encourages Bill to "stick around as long as you like."

Bill confesses his fear of parachuting to Kit.  When the recruits make their first practice jump, a nervous trainee loses his nerve, pulls a pistol, and demands that the aircraft land. Bill talks him into giving him the gun. Impressed by Bill's nerve, Richards reveals to the company that he is the commandant's son, but Bill confesses his fear and applies for a transfer to another branch. Richards helps him overcome his fear of jumping and Bill saves his life in the process.

Bill's romantic rivalry with Don comes to a head when Don gets word that he is to receive an officer's commission and decides to ask Kit to marry him. Bill's anger at Don makes him careless in packing his parachute. Before Don can propose, Bill goes to Kit and admits he loves her. The rivals brawl just before the start of a demonstration airborne assault in which they are assigned the task blowing up an ammunition warehouse.

Their transport aircraft takes off without them while their sergeant, Tex (Paul Kelly), breaks up the fight. To keep them out of trouble, Tex arranges for a small observation aircraft to take them up. However, when Don jumps, his parachute becomes tangled with the tail of the aircraft. Bill crawls back and cuts the tangled shroud lines as Don hangs on to him.

The two descend together and Don reveals that he repacked Bill's chute, saving both their lives.  Friends again, they destroy the objective. At the ceremony awarding them their parachute wings, Richards gives his blessing to Kit and Bill, while Don sets his sights on another woman.

Cast

 Robert Preston as Donald Morse
 Nancy Kelly as Kit Richards
 Edmond O'Brien as Bill Burke
 Harry Carey as Bill Richards
 Buddy Ebsen as Jeff Hollis
 Paul Kelly as Tex
 Richard Cromwell as Spence
 Robert Barrat as Col. Burke
 Edward Fielding as Chief of Infantry	
 Erville Alderson as Pa Hollis
 Selmer Jackson as Thomas Morse
 Grant Withers as Captain

Production
From the signing of the Selective Training and Service Act of 1940 in the United States and American interest of military matters, Hollywood provided a rash of films in 1941 about the various branches of the US Armed Forces, both serious and comic.

In its entry in the genre, RKO sent a film crew to Fort Benning to film America's recently formed paratroopers of the 501st Parachute Infantry for their film.  The founder of the American parachute troops General William C. Lee doubled for Robert Preston in some scenes.

Reception
Reviewer Bosley Crowther wrote in The New York Times that "this familiarly patterned item, which came yesterday to the Rialto, is an inspirational and educational survey of the way in which our Army trains parachute troops, contained within a purely convenient and contrived fiction plot."Parachute Battalion made a profit of $128,000.

See also
 Airborne
 Jumping Jacks
 West Point of the Air

Notes

References

Bibliography

 Coffman, Edward M. The Regulars: The American Army 1898-1941. Boston: Harvard University Press, 2004. .
 Jewell, Richard  and Vernon Harbin. The RKO Story. New Rochelle, New York: Arlington House, 1982. .

External links
 
 
 

1941 films
American aviation films
American black-and-white films
Films scored by Roy Webb
Films directed by Leslie Goodwins
Skydiving in fiction
American war films
1940s war films
1940s English-language films
1940s American films